The F class were a class of diesel locomotives built by English Electric, Rocklea for the Midland Railway of Western Australia in 1958. They were later sold to the Western Australian Government Railways.

History
The F class was based upon the South Australian Railways 800 class. The seven members of the class entered service with the Midland Railway of Western Australia in 1958, and, together with the rest of the company's assets and operations, were taken over by the Western Australian Government Railways in 1964.

The first (F42) was withdrawn in November 1984.

Hotham Valley Railway have preserved F40 and F44 while Rail Heritage WA have F43. F41 is also on display at Moora.

References

A1A-A1A locomotives
English Electric locomotives
Diesel locomotives of Western Australia
Railway locomotives introduced in 1958
3 ft 6 in gauge locomotives of Australia
Diesel-electric locomotives of Australia